John Robert Sitlington Sterrett (1851 in Rockbridge Baths, Virginia —June 15, 1914) was an American classical scholar and archeologist. He was Professor of Greek at Cornell University from 1901. He was known for his expeditions, to present-day Turkey and other places in the Near East. Some of his work was illustrated by photographers by John Henry Haynes.

Notes

External links
 
The J. R. Sitlington Sterrett Collection of Archaeological Photographs, Cornell Collections of Antiquities
John Robert Sitlington and Josephine Quarrier Sterrett Family Papers at the Amherst College Archives & Special Collections

American classical scholars
American archaeologists
Classical scholars of Cornell University
Category;1851 births
1914 deaths
Travelers in Asia Minor
Amherst College faculty